Joseph Chandler may refer to:

 Joseph Ripley Chandler (1792–1880), member of the U.S. House of Representatives from Pennsylvania
 Joseph P. Chandler (1840–1910), member of the Wisconsin State Assembly
 Joseph Everett Chandler (1863–1946), Colonial Revival architecture
 Joseph Goodhue Chandler (1813–1884), American portrait painter
 Joseph Newton Chandler III (1926–2002), formerly unidentified identity thief
 Joe Chandler (born 1988), rugby league footballer
 Joe Chandler (footballer) (1877–1966), Australian rules footballer